Sesamia cretica, the corn stem borer, greater sugarcane borer, sorghum stem borer, stem corn borer, durra stem borer, large corn borer, pink sugarcane borer, sugarcane pink borer, sorghum borer, pink corn borer, maize borer or purple stem borer, is a moth of the family Noctuidae. It was described by Julius Lederer in 1857. It is found in most of the countries and islands of the Mediterranean basin. The range extends through the Middle East and Arabia to Pakistan, northern India and northern Africa. In the south, the range extends to northern Kenya and northern Cameroon.

The larvae are a pest. They have been recorded feeding on Oryza sativa, Panicum miliaceum, Pennisetum glaucum, Poaceae species, Saccharum officinarum, Sorghum bicolor, Triticum species and Zea mays. They feed on the epidermal tissues and later bore into the heart of the host plant. Third-instar larvae move to the lower part of the stalk near the soil level. The larvae hibernate in the tunnels from July to January. Pupation also takes place here.

References

 "Sesamia cretica Lederer, 1857". European Butterflies and Moths. Archived December 3, 2013

Moths described in 1857
Hadeninae
Moths of Europe
Moths of Asia
Moths of the Middle East
Insect pests of millets